Preston Fassel (born September 11, 1985) is an author and journalist primarily known for his work in the horror, science fiction, and crime genres. His work has appeared in Fangoria, Rue Morgue, Screem magazine, and on Cinedump.com. He is the author of Remembering Vanessa, the first biography of actress Vanessa Howard, published in the Spring 2014 issue of Screem. From 2017 to 2020, he was a staff writer for Fangoria; in 2018, the magazine published his debut novel, Our Lady of the Inferno, as the first entry in their "FANGORIA Presents" imprint. The book received an overwhelmingly positive critical response, and was named one of the ten best horror books of 2018 by Bloody Disgusting.

Early life

Fassel was born in Houston, Texas, but spent his childhood between St. Louis, Missouri and Broken Arrow, Oklahoma. He was raised Catholic; his mother's family coming from a line of Poles and ethnic Jews who had converted. His father worked for the phone company, and he grew up around telecommunications equipment, later comparing part of his childhood experience to the aesthetics of Videodrome.

When he was seventeen, Fassel dropped out of high school and obtained his GED after budget cuts resulted in the elimination of most of his school's elective courses. After obtaining his GED, he interned for the Broken Arrow police department evidence room, where he received the President's Volunteer Service Award for his work. He attended community college at Lone Star College in Conroe, Texas, where he began writing short stories set in 1970s Times Square that were published in the campus's literary journal. He late transferred to Sam Houston State University, from which he graduated in 2011 with a degree in psychology.

Fassel spent his teenage years renting grindhouse, horror, and exploitation films from local video rental stores in Oklahoma, initially out of a desire to desensitize himself to disturbing imagery and as an act of defiance against what he perceived of as the oppressively conservative culture of rural Oklahoma; he would later credit his love of horror cinema as contributing to his desire to become a horror writer.  He further credited his mother's purchasing him a copy of Stephen King's The Shining with inspiring him to become a horror writer, and Bill Landis and Michelle Clifford's Sleazoid Express with interesting him in 42nd street culture.

Career

Fassel initially began writing for an optometric trade publication while working as an optician, receiving a job offer after writing a letter to the editor. He later transitioned into writing for Rue Morgue after pitching a story to their editor-in-chief at a horror convention, beginning by writing reviews and later transitioning into writing feature stories. During his time at the magazine, Fassel was nominated for the Rondo Hatton Classic Horror Award for an interview he conducted with Herschell Gordon Lewis. Concurrently to his time with Rue Morgue, Fassel also contributed to the pop culture websites Cinedump.com and HeardTell.com, being nominated for a further two Rondo awards for an interview with Kelli Maroney and in the best category article, respectively. He spent 2013 researching the life of actress Vanessa Howard, culminating in the first published biography of her, "Remembering Vanessa," printed in the Spring 2014 issue of Screem magazine.

Beginning in 2007, Fassel began working on a book he would later call "the theater story" that acted as an expansion of the short stories he had written in college; he worked on it for a period of about six years before shelving the project because "it was really terrible" and, despite being 250,000 words, "nothing had happened in it yet." He would later recycle ideas from "the theater story" into his debut novel, Our Lady of the Inferno. Fassel initially sold the book to an independent press called Fear Front based out of Georgia, shortly before the company went out of business. Around the time of the book's publication, Fassel worked as an extra on the set of Puppet Master: The Littlest Reich, where he met producer Dallas Sonnier, who expressed interest in acquiring the film rights; Fassel later convinced Sonnier to purchase the republication rights as well. Fassel additionally asked for a job with Sonnier's production company, Cinestate, as part of the deal, unaware that Sonnier had recently purchased Fangoria magazine; Sonnier subsequently hired Fassel to work for the publication. He joined the staff as a writer in 2017; from 2018 until the magazine's 2020 sale, he wrote a column called Corrupt Signals, focusing on obscure and foreign horror cinema. For his work with Fangoria, Fassel was nominated  for a Rondo award for best column and (along with Tate Steinsiek) best article.

Fangoria republished Our Lady of the Inferno in September 2018 to generally positive reviews. It was named one of Bloody Disgusting's ten best horror books of 2018, and won gold in the horror category at the 2019 Independent Publisher Book Awards

In 2018, it was announced that a film adaptation of the book was in development at Fangoria, with Fassel collaborating on the screenplay and serving as an executive producer alongside Sonnier and Phil Nobile Jr.

In 2019, it was announced that Fangoria would publish Fassel's second novel, Beasts of 42nd Street, in 2020. In 2020, he served as the editor for Mick Garris' debut anthology, These Evil Things We Do. Following the 2020 sale of Fangoria to Tara Ansley and Abhi Goel, Fassel said that the publishing rights to Beasts had reverted to him, and that the option on the film rights to Our Lady of the Inferno would expire in 2022. In 2021, he published his first novella, a science fiction horror-comedy, The Despicable Fantasies of Quentin Sergenov, with 35% of proceeds going to The Trevor Project.

In 2021 Fassel published his first nonfiction work, Landis: The Story of a Real Man on 42nd Street, the first ever biography of Sleazoid Express founder Bill Landis, which also includes a history of the magazine.

Personal life

Fassel has referred to himself as Catholic in interviews. He identifies as ethnically, though not religiously, Jewish, and has said that his Jewish cultural heritage has had a "tremendous impact" on him.

Bibliography

Novels
2016: Our Lady of the Inferno
TBA: Beasts of 42nd Street

Novellas
2021: The Despicable Fantasies of Quentin Sergenov

Nonfiction
2021: Landis: The Story of a Real Man on 42nd Street

Anthologies
2019: My Favorite Horror Movie 3: Scream Warriors (essay "Videodrome")

As editor
2020: These Evil Things We Do: The Mick Garris Collection by Mick Garris

Awards and nominations

References

1985 births
Living people
21st-century American novelists
American horror novelists
People from Houston
Novelists from Texas
Writers from Texas
21st-century American male writers
Jewish American novelists
21st-century American Jews
American science fiction writers